Phyllonorycter nigrescentella is a moth of the family Gracillariidae. It is known from all of Europe except the Balkan Peninsula.

The wingspan is 7–9 mm. The head is fuscous, face leaden-metallic. Forewings golden-ochreous, sometimes more or less suffused with fuscous or dark fuscous; a silvery-white dark-edged median streak from base to 1/3; a curved fascia before middle, three posterior costal and two dorsal triangular spots silvery-white, dark-margined; a blackish apical spot. Hindwings are rather dark grey. The larva is yellowish; dorsal line dark green; head very pale brownish.

The larvae feed on Lathyrus vernus, Lotus, Medicago, Trifolium alpestre, Trifolium medium, Trifolium pratense, Trifolium repens, Trifolium rubens, Vicia dumetorum, Vicia sativa and Vicia sepium. They mine the leaves of their host plant. They create a lower surface tentiform mine that occupies an entire leaflet. The lower epidermis is strongly folded. Fully developed mines are strongly inflated and the leaflet is completely folded over the mine making it practically invisible.

References

nigrescentella
Moths of Europe
Moths described in 1851